AFL (usually referred to as AFL Wii) is an AFL sports game for the Wii. It was developed by Wicked Witch Software. It was released on 19 May 2011.
Commentating is provided by Dennis Cometti and Brian Taylor.

Game features 
16 stadiums
5 different leagues (AFL, VFL, TAC Cup, NAB U18's National Championships, International Cup).
Over 70 licensed teams
Arcade style gameplay
29 player attributes
10 year career management mode. 
5 mini games.

Gameplay 
Team management appears to focus on coaching, training, trading, drafting, tribunal and budget, while the in game gameplay, covers the actual game of the sport itself. The game has more arcade elements then the Big Ant Studios version, but claims to still maintain a fair amount of simulation and options to set the level of this. On screen meters can also be turned on and off.

The game supports 3 controller types; The standard Wii remote, the Wii remote with the Nunchuck and the GameCube Controller. Wicked Witch stated that the controls are intuitive but can take time to learn. Wii remote shaking is used to successfully tackle or break a tackle. There are 4 types of kicks including Drop Punts, Torpedoes, Snaps (Check Sides) and Grubbers but only 1 type of handball which increases in elevation depending on power.

The game also features a ten-year manager mode.

Multiplayer 
Multiplayer supports up to 8 players  but does not include online gameplay. Players can drop in and out of a career game.

Game of the Year Edition
The Game of the Year Edition was released on 12 July 2012 for the Wii. It is an update for the 2012 AFL season, with updated team lists and on-field uniforms for the 2012 season, Skoda Stadium is to be playable and the ability to play as the Greater Western Sydney Giants.

See also
 AFL Live

References

External links 
 AFL Wii website

AFL (video game series)
Australian rules football video games
Video games developed in Australia
Australia-exclusive video games
2011 video games
Wii-only games
Video games set in Australia
Multiplayer and single-player video games
Wii games
Wicked Witch Software games
Tru Blu Entertainment games